The Wales Act 2017 (c. 7) is an Act of the Parliament of the United Kingdom. It sets out amendments to the Government of Wales Act 2006 and devolves further powers to Wales. The legislation is based on the proposals of the St David's Day Command Paper.

Background 
The bill was proposed by the Conservative Party in its manifesto for the 2015 general election.

The draft Wales Bill was presented in October 2015 and faced much criticism from the public over tests for competence (also known as "necessity tests"). As a result, the bill had been put on hold by the beginning of 2016. An amended bill was introduced into the House of Commons on 1 June 2016.

Main provisions 
One of the most important provisions is that the Act moved Wales from a conferred matters model to a reserved matters model, which is used in Scotland under the Scotland Act 1998. The Act repealed the provision of the Wales Act 2014 for a referendum in Wales on devolution of income tax.

The Act gives extra powers to the National Assembly for Wales and the Welsh Government:
 The ability to amend sections of the Government of Wales Act 2006 which relate to the operation of the National Assembly for Wales and the Welsh Government within the United Kingdom, including control of its electoral system (subject to a two-thirds majority within the Assembly) for any proposed  change.
 The ability to use such amendment to devolve powers to the National Assembly for Wales and the Welsh Ministers over areas such as road signs, onshore oil and gas activity, harbours, rail franchising, energy efficiency, and advice.
 The power to change the name of the National Assembly for Wales. On 9 October 2019 the Assembly agreed that the new name would be Welsh Parliament / Senedd Cymru. It came into effect in May 2020.
 The ability to raise or lower income tax by up to 10p in the pound
 The Welsh Government to have increased borrowing powers to support capital investment, up to £1 billion
 Extended powers over equalities and tribunals
 Creation of Welsh Revenue Authority, a tax authority for Welsh devolved taxes while HMRC collects taxes that are not devolved to Wales

The Act recognised the National Assembly for Wales and the Welsh Government as permanent among UK's constitutional arrangements, with a referendum required before either can be abolished. The Act has also recognised that there is a body of Welsh law and it established the position of President of Welsh Tribunals.

See also 

 Welsh devolution
 Government of Wales Act 1998
 Government of Wales Act 2006
 Wales Act 2014

References 

Welsh devolution
United Kingdom Acts of Parliament 2017
Acts of the Parliament of the United Kingdom concerning Wales
Constitutional laws of Wales
January 2017 events in the United Kingdom